The Signal Foundation, officially the Signal Technology Foundation, is an American non-profit organization founded in 2018 by Moxie Marlinspike and Brian Acton. Its mission is "to develop open-source privacy technology that protects free expression and enables secure global communication."
Its subsidiary, Signal Messenger LLC, is responsible for the development of the Signal messaging app and the Signal Protocol.

History 
On February 21, 2018, Moxie Marlinspike and WhatsApp co-founder Brian Acton announced the formation of the Signal Foundation, a 501(c)(3) nonprofit organization. The foundation was started with an initial $50 million loan from Acton, who had left WhatsApp's parent company, Facebook, in September 2017. The Freedom of the Press Foundation had previously served as the Signal project's fiscal sponsor and continued to accept donations on behalf of the project while the foundation's non-profit status was pending. By the end of 2018, the loan had increased to $105,000,400, which is due to be repaid on February 28, 2068.  The loan is unsecured and at 0% interest.

Senior leadership 
Signal Foundation has been led by a Chairman, which is separate from the leadership roles of Signal Messenger.

List of chairmen 

 Brian Acton (2018–present)

People

As of October 2020, the Signal Foundation board of directors has three members:
Brian Acton
Moxie Marlinspike
Meredith Whittaker (current president, 2022-09-06)

Signal Messenger LLC

Signal Messenger LLC was founded simultaneously with the Signal Technology Foundation and operates as its subsidiary. It is responsible for the development of the Signal messaging app and the Signal Protocol. Moxie Marlinspike served as Signal Messenger's first CEO until stepping down on January 10, 2022. Brian Acton has volunteered to serve as interim CEO while the organization searches for a new CEO.

Senior leadership 
Along with the Chairman of the Signal Foundation, Signal Messenger has been traditionally led by a CEO. This was until September 2022, when a new role of President was created, which is dedicated to more core lanes of strategy.

List of CEOs 

 Moxie Marlinspike (2018–2022)
 Brian Acton; interim (2022–present)

List of presidents 

 Meredith Whittaker (2022–present)

References

Further reading

External links 
 
 "Signal Foundation", announcement by Moxie Marlinspike and Brian Acton, 21 February 2018

Charities based in California
Free software project foundations in the United States
Non-profit organizations based in the San Francisco Bay Area
Organizations established in 2018
2018 establishments in California
Companies based in Mountain View, California
Free and open-source software organizations